Blue River Valley Junior/Senior High School is a public high school located northeast of New Castle, Indiana.

About
The school serves about 300 students in grades 7 through 12. It is one of 5 high schools in Henry County, Indiana. The principal is Adam Perdue.

Blue River Valley Schools are located on one campus near the source of Big Blue River and are sited overlooking Big Blue River and the Blue River Valley.  The school corporation serves Blue River and Prairie Townships in northern Henry County.

Athletics
Blue River participates in class 1A Indiana High School Athletic Association athletics  in the Mid-Eastern Conference.

Boys'
- Golf, Baseball, Basketball, Wrestling, Track, Cross Country, and Tennis.

Girls'
- Golf, Basketball, Wrestling, Track, Cross Country, Tennis, and Volleyball.

See also
 List of high schools in Indiana

References

External links
Blue River Valley School Corporation

Public high schools in Indiana
Public middle schools in Indiana
Schools in Henry County, Indiana